Chandrakanti is a deep-fried dessert made from green gram and rice flour. It is a sweet dish originally from coastal Odisha in eastern India.

Ingredients
Green gram
Sugar
Rice
Cows' ghee
Salt
Oil (for the deep frying)

See also
Oriya cuisine

References

Odia cuisine
Indian desserts